Actia infantula is a Palearctic species of fly in the family Tachinidae.

Distribution
Spain, Switzerland, France, Italy, Sweden, Hungary, Israel, Russia.

Hosts
The Skin Moth Monopis laevigella.

References

infantula
Muscomorph flies of Europe
Diptera of Asia
Insects described in 1844